School District 68 may refer to:
 Oak Grove School District 68 (Bartonville, Illinois), with two primary schools in Peoria County
 Oak Grove School District 68 (Lake County, Illinois), with one primary school in Oak Grove
 Skokie School District 68
 Woodridge School District 68